Kadino is the name of several rural localities in Russia:
Kadino, Smolensk Oblast, a village in Tatarskoye Rural Settlement of Monastyrshchinsky District in Smolensk Oblast
Kadino, Tver Oblast, a village in Mednovskoye Rural Settlement of Kalininsky District in Tver Oblast
Kadino, Yaroslavl Oblast, a village in Varegovsky Rural Okrug of Bolsheselsky District in Yaroslavl Oblast